Akelarre is the seventh studio album by the thrash metal/death metal band Criminal.

Track listing 
 "Order from Chaos" – 4:53
 "Resistance Is Futile" – 4:40
 "The Ghost We Summoned" – 4:03
 "Akelarre" – 1:59
 "State of Siege" – 4:10
 "Tyrannicide" – 4:21
 "Feel the Void" – 4:40
 "The Power of the Dog" – 3:35
 "Vows of Silence" – 4:16
 "La Santa Muerte" – 4:47

References

Criminal (band) albums
2011 albums